Sandal and Walton railway station was opened on 1 June 1870 by the Midland Railway on its line from Derby to Leeds Wellington Station.

The station was south of Wakefield, lying between Sandal and Walton in West Yorkshire, England.

It was of typical Midland brick-built construction. In 1926 the line was quadrupled, with the new goods lines passing to the east of the two platforms. It closed on 12 June 1961.

To the north of the station a junction had been built in 1868 with a curve to meet the West Riding and Grimsby Railway jointly owned by the MS&LR and the GNR. This enabled goods services and southbound passenger trains to run from Wakefield. However this service finished during the First World War.

References

External links
 Sandal and Walton station on navigable O. S. map

Disused railway stations in Wakefield
Railway stations in Great Britain opened in 1870
Railway stations in Great Britain closed in 1961
Former Midland Railway stations
railway station